Yau is a surname. It is a romanisation of multiple surnames in Hong Kong as well as other Cantonese speaking regions, based on different varieties of Chinese, as well as a surname in other cultures.

Among respondents to the 2000 United States Census, Yau was the 394th-most common surname among Asian Pacific Americans, and 10,881th-most common overall, with 2,686 bearers (93.9% of whom identified as Asian/Pacific Islander).

Cantonese romanisation of 丘

Shing-Tung Yau (born 1949), Chinese-born American mathematician
Stephen Shing-Toung Yau (born 1952), Hong Kong-born American mathematician, brother of Shing-Tung Yau
Algernon Yau (born 1959), Hong Kong businessperson and polictican
Alan Yau (born 1962), Hong Kong-born British restaurateur
Yau Kin Wai (born 1973), Hong Kong football defender

Cantonese romanisation of 邱

Yau Leung (1941–1997), Hong Kong street photographer
Yau Lop Poon (born 1950), Hong Kong journalist
Edward Yau (born 1960), Hong Kong government official
Herman Yau (born 1961), Hong Kong film director
Chingmy Yau (born 1968), Hong Kong actress
Benny Yau (born 1980), Hong Kong-born Canadian television presenter
Johnny Yau, Hong Kong television businessman
Yung Yau, Hong Kong housing studies professor
Stanley Yau, member of Hong Kong boy band MIRROR
Tiger Yau, member of Hong Kong boy band MIRROR
Vivian Yau,British Chinese activist

Cantonese romanisation of 尤

Yau Lit (1864–1936), Chinese revolutionary
Carrie Yau (born 1955), Hong Kong government official

Cantonese romanisation of 游

King-Wai Yau (born 1948), Chinese-born American neuroscientist
Patrick Yau (born 1964), Hong Kong film director
Yau Nai-hoi (born 1968), Hong Kong screenwriter
Yau Kam Leung (born 1985), Hong Kong football defender
Neo Yau (born 1990), Hong Kong actor
Yau Wai-ching (born 1991), Hong Kong politician

Mandarin romanisation of 姚

Yau is the spelling in Gwoyeu Romatzyh (a less common-system of transcribing Mandarin Chinese) of the surname spelled Yào in the more widespread pinyin system.

Horng-Tzer Yau (born 1959), Taiwanese-born American mathematician
John Yau (born 1950), American poet of Chinese descent

Other
People with a non-Chinese surname Yau, or whose names as written in Chinese characters are not available:
Sahabi Alhaji Yaú (born 1956), Nigerian politician
Yairo Yau (born 1989), Panamanian footballer
Stephen Sik-Sang Yau, American computer scientist
David Yau Yau, South Sudanese government administrator and former insurrectionist leader

References

Chinese-language surnames
Multiple Chinese surnames